Nawab Begum Sajida Sultan Ali Khan Pataudi (4 August 1915 – 5 September 1995) was the daughter of the Nawab of Bhopal, Hamidullah Khan, and the wife and Begum Consort of Iftikhar Ali Khan Pataudi, the 8th Nawab of Pataudi, and in her own right, the 12th Nawab Begum of Bhopal.

Biography

Sajida Sultan was born on 4 August 1915 in the Qasr-e-Sultani Palace, Bhopal, to Nawab Hamidullah Khan, last ruling Nawab of Bhopal and his wife, Begum Maimoona Sultan. She was the second of three children; she had an older sister, Abida Sultan, and a younger sister, Rabia Sultan. Sultan Jahan, the Begum of Bhopal, was her grandmother, and her predecessor Shah Jahan Begum was her great-grandmother. The Pakistani diplomat Shahryar Khan, is her nephew through her sister Abida.

On 23 April 1939, Sajida married Nawab Iftikhar Ali Khan, 8th Nawab of Pataudi. Together they had three daughters – Saleha, Sabiha, and Qudsia – and a son, the cricketer Mansoor Ali Khan Pataudi. Sher Ali Khan Pataudi, the major general in the Pakistan Army was her brother-in-law by marriage. The actors Saif Ali Khan and Soha Ali Khan, the jewelry designer Saba Ali Khan and the cricketer Saad Bin Jung are her grandsons and granddaughters. Sara Ali Khan, an actress in the Hindi film industry is her great-granddaughter.

On 5 January 1952, Iftikhar Ali Khan died and Mansoor succeeded his father as the 9th titular Nawab of Pataudi.

In 1960, upon the death of her father, she became titular ruler of Bhopal. Her older sister, Abida, was the heiress apparent to the title but had emigrated to Pakistan in 1950 and declined to return to Bhopal permanently; her son declined also. Sajida was formally recognised as the Nawab Begum of Bhopal in 1962, with recognition being effective from 1960.

She died on 5 September 1995 at the age of 80. Mansoor Ali Khan subsequently became the mutawalli of the Auqaf-e-Shahi of Bhopal, a title which is currently held by her granddaughter Saba Ali Khan.

Issue

See also
 Pataudi family

References

1915 births
1995 deaths
Begums of Bhopal
20th-century Indian Muslims
Muslim monarchs
Indian people of Pashtun descent
20th-century Indian women
20th-century Indian people